

Notes

References

Bibliography 
Rayfield, D. (2013) Edge of Empires: A History of Georgia, Reaktion Books, 
Rapp, S. H. Jr. (2016) The Sasanian World Through Georgian Eyes, Caucasia and the Iranian Commonwealth in Late Antique Georgian Literature, Sam Houston State University, USA, Routledge, 
Settipani, C. (2006) Continuité des élites à Byzance durant les siècles obscurs. Les princes caucasiens et l'Empire du VIe au IXe siècle, Paris, 

Lists of Georgian monarchs
Bagrationi dynasty of Tao-Klarjeti
Georgian family trees